Loquard is an old village, now part of Krummhörn in Ostfriesland in the modern nation-state of Germany. It is part of the Aurich rural governmental district of the state of Lower Saxony (Niedersachsen). It is a traditionally Lutheran village.

Krummhörn
Towns and villages in East Frisia